His Master's Voice is a 2018 Hungarian science fiction film by György Pálfi loosely based on the novel His Master's Voice  by Polish science fiction writer Stanisław Lem.

The film follows a man who thinks he saw his father in a documentary about a mysterious incident in Colorado, around which a conspiracy theory had been formed. He embarks on the search of his father, who had fled Communist Hungary years ago. Eventually he finds his father, now a well-off university professor with a new family, but whose life is still affected by his previous work to decode the "message from space".

The film was backed by a $2.54 million grant from the Hungarian National Film Fund. While the majority of filming was in Hungary, His Master's Voice was also shot in various locations around Ottawa, Canada. The film has elements of mockumentary, featuring shots with outdated cameras and formats.

His Master's Voice premiered at the 2018 Tokyo International Film Festival. At the 2019 Fantasporto International Film Festival, the film received the prize for the Best Visual Effects.

References

External links
 

2018 films
2010s Hungarian-language films
Films directed by György Pálfi
Hungarian science fiction films
Films based on works by Stanisław Lem
2018 science fiction films